Augusta is an unincorporated community in eastern Augusta Township, Carroll County, Ohio, United States.  It has a post office with the ZIP code 44607.  It lies along State Route 9. The community is part of the Canton–Massillon Metropolitan Statistical Area.

History
The village of Augusta was platted in 1811 by Jacob Brown.

Geography
Augusta is located at DMS: 40° 41′ 9″ N, 81° 1′ 15″ W,  Decimal: 40.685833, -81.020833
Altitude: 1236.9 Feet
Augusta is located Northeast of Carrollton, Ohio and Southeast of Minerva, Ohio.

Education
Students attend Carrollton Exempted Village School District. 
Students previously attended Augusta Elementary school, most recently grades K-6. Augusta Elementary School was demolished in 2019.

Augusta Elementary School
Augusta Elementary School was built in 1928. It was located at 3117 Aurora Rd NE, Carrollton, OH 44615. Augusta Elementary School was razed August 2019.

References

Unincorporated communities in Carroll County, Ohio
Unincorporated communities in Ohio